Kansas Citizens for Science (KCFS) is a science advocacy organization, incorporated as a not-for-profit 501(c)(3), that "promotes a better understanding of what science is, and does, by: advocating for science education, educating the public about the nature and value of science, and serving as an information resource." KCFS has been active in both local and national evolution-advocacy efforts and served as the prototype for other Citizens for Science organizations.

Formation
By law, Kansas' educational standards require periodic revision. In 1999, a revision was scheduled for the state science standards. The state board chose a committee of approximately 25 expert Kansans, including science educators and businesspeople, to rewrite the standards completely. Although the committee did its work well, Creationists began attending the hearings of the science committee of the state board and toured the state giving presentations critical of the evolution in the draft science standards. At the same time, a local Lawrence, Kansas group called POSH (Parents for Objective Science and History) began lobbying the local school board for creationist changes to the Lawrence curriculum.

Despite the work of the committee, toward the end of the process, the creationists on the state board – who were primarily Young Earth Creationists - attempted to influence the standards. At that point, the board was split 5 to 5 on many issues. Led by Steve Abrams, then board president, the creationists collaborated with the Creation Science Association of Mid America to change the committee's recommendations, removing significant references to evolution and replacing material with creationist perspectives. They were able to convince one state board member to switch sides and vote in favor of the creationist science standards.

Reactions included recruiting those who wrote pro-science letters to newspapers in order to generate a core group of activists. Although these activists originally met to coordinate testimony before board meetings, a week prior to the actual BOE vote over the standards, KCFS was incorporated on 8 August 1999. Holding a media conference on the steps of the Kansas Museum of Natural History the next day, they pledged to combat the anti-science activities of the board.

Two days later, on 11 August 1999, the Kansas State Board of Education voted 6–4 to approve creation science-friendly standards that minimized teaching the theories of evolution, the Big Bang, and geological time. Although they did not outlaw the teaching of evolution, they did open the standards to local control, prompting several communities, including Pratt, Kansas, to adopt overtly creationist standards.

KCFS recruited participants from across the state and led the fight to correct the standards the creationists had passed. They formed relationships with educational and scientific organizations both across Kansas and throughout the US. At the next election, Kansas voters replaced the creationists with a pro-science majority and within a few months, the standards recommended by the expert committee were passed, replacing the creationist standards that de-emphasized evolution.

The National Citizens for Science Movement
The method whereby KCFS organized was noted by national pro-science organizations. The attacks on evolution are nationwide and prominent members of the pro-science community are pushing for nationwide duplication of the KCFS method. One result was the Citizens for Science movement, which seeks to promote communication and cooperation between KCFS-like entities in each state.

External links
Kansas Citizens for Science

Citizen alliances for science
Science advocacy organizations